This is the timeline of the development of the Eurofighter Typhoon, a multirole fighter aircraft manufactured by a consortium of European aerospace manufacturers, Eurofighter GmbH, formed in 1983.

1970s
 1972
 Royal Air Force (RAF) issues Air Staff Target 396 (AST-396), a requirement for a STOVL aircraft to replace the Harrier and Jaguar fleets.
 AST-403, specification revised for an air superiority fighter. STOVL requirement dropped and AST-409 lead to the development of Harrier GR5.
 Mid-1970s
 France, Germany and the UK initiate the European Combat Aircraft (ECA) programme.
 1979
 Following differing requirements (particularly French requirement for carrier compatibility,) BAe and MBB propose the European Combat Fighter (ECF)

1980s
 1981
 Development of different national prototypes and continued differences over specification lead to cancellation of ECF programme.
 Panavia partners (Germany, Italy and UK) launch Agile Combat Aircraft (ACA) programme. Following failure of Germany and Italy to fund development the UK MoD pays £80m prototype, the Experimental Aircraft Programme (EAP).
 1983
 May - contract for production of EAP prototype signed.
 The UK, France, Germany, Italy and Spain launch Future European Fighter Aircraft (F/EFA) programme. Aircraft to have short take off and landing (STOL) and beyond visual range (BVR) capabilities.
 1984
 France reiterates requirement for carrier capable version. The UK, Germany and Italy opt out and establish new EFA programme.
 1985
 France officially withdraws, commences ACX project.
 27 October - EAP demonstrator rolled out at BAe Warton.
 1986
 June - Eurofighter GmbH established.
 8 August - EAP makes its first flight, piloted by David Eagles. Configuration closely matches final Eurofighter design.
 Rolls-Royce, MTU Aero Engines, FiatAvio (now Avio) and ITP form EuroJet Turbo GmbH for development of EJ200.
 1988
 23 November - contracts signed for production of demonstrator engines and airframes.

1990s
 1990
 EuroRADAR formed for development of ECR-90 (CAPTOR) radar.
 1991
 1 May - last flight of EAP demonstrator.
 1992
 EuroDASS formed for development of defensive aids sub system (DASS.) Initially only UK and Italy participate. When Eurofighter enters service only RAF aircraft will exploit all capabilities of DASS.
 July - Germany announces intention to withdraw from the DASS element. Negotiations begin to reduce costs. As a single engine aircraft is ruled out Germany decides to fit cheaper systems, e.g., F/A-18's APG-65 in place of ECR-90, and delay its service entry by two years. Germany eventually participates in all systems.
 December - renamed Eurofighter 2000.
 1994
 27 March - maiden flight of first development aircraft, DA1 from DASA at Manching with RB199 engines.
 6 April - maiden flight of second development aircraft, DA2 from BAe Warton. DA2 also flew with RB199s.
 1995
 4 June - maiden flight of Italian DA3, the first with EJ200 engines.
 1996
 31 August - Spanish DA6 becomes the first two-seater to fly.
 1997
 27 January - first flight of DA7 from Turin.
 24 February - maiden flight of German DA5, first aircraft to be fitted with ECR-90.
 14 March - maiden flight of UK's DA4, the second two-seater and last of the seven development aircraft.
 1998
 January - first aerial refuelling trials, involving DA2 and an RAF VC10 tanker.
 30 January - NETMA and Eurofighter GmbH sign production and support contracts for 620 aircraft.
 September - "Typhoon" name adopted, announced as strictly for export contracts. There is some controversy as the last aircraft to bear the name was the Hawker Typhoon, a World War II aircraft.
 18 December - Tranche 1 contract signed.
 1999
 Eurofighter International established as single contracting-management company to handle all export sales.

2000s
 2000
 8 March - first export sale, 60 ordered and 30 options by Greece (but delayed, maybe cancelled).
 16 May - UK commits to MBDA Meteor BVRAAM, leading to significant benefits for export prospects.
 7 July - DA2 emerges from ten month stand down with latest avionics. Finished in black (see below) to reduce cosmetic effect of 490 pressure transducers applied to airframe.
 2002
 5 April - Instrumented Production Aircraft (IPA2) makes maiden flight from Turin.
 11 April - IPA 3 makes maiden flight from EADS Military Aircraft, Manching, Germany.
 15 April - IPA 1 makes maiden flight from BAE Warton.
 2 July - Austria announces acquisition of 24 Typhoons, later reduced to 18.
 23 July - "Typhoon" name officially adopted as in-service name by four partner nations.
 21 November - DA6, flying out of Getafe, crashes. Twin engine failure is blamed.
 2003
 13 February - first series production aircraft, GT001 flies from Manching. This is the first of Germany's 180 aircraft.
 14 February - in the space of just over an hour Italy's IT001 and Britain's BT001 make their maiden flights.
 17 February - Spain's ST001 flies from EADS Military Aircraft, Getafe, Spain.
 30 June - "type acceptance" signed, marking formal delivery of aircraft to the partner nations.
October - integration of Meteor begins.
 2004
 27 June - two RAF Typhoon T1s depart UK for Singapore for marketing and training.
 15 December - UK confirms purchase of second batch of 89 aircraft, the last nation to commit to "Tranche 2" production of 236 aircraft.
 2005
April - Singapore drops the Typhoon from its shortlist to supply the country's next generation fighter.
 16 December - the Aeronautica Militare Italiana (Italian Air Force) declares the Typhoon's initial operational capability and sets it on quick reaction alert from Grosseto Air Base.
 21 December - Saudi Arabia agrees to a purchase of an unspecified number of Typhoons with the UK Ministry of Defence.
 2006
January - first AMI operational squadron formed.
February - first operational mission undertaken by the Italian Air Force as Eurofighter Typhoon defends the airspace over Turin during the 2006 Winter Olympics.
 31 March - first RAF operational squadron formed.
 18 August - announcement of Saudi Arabia signing a contract to buy 72 planes from the UK.
 3 October - 100th production aircraft delivered.
 2007
 12 July - the first Eurofighter for Austria is delivered to the Austrian Air Force.
 2008
 16 January - the first Tranche 2 Eurofighter Typhoon makes its first flight.
 22 October - first flight of Typhoon in Royal Saudi Air Force livery.
 2009
 12 June - first Saudi Typhoons delivered.
 25 November - 200th Typhoon delivered.

2010s
 2010
 24 August - a Spanish Eurofighter crashes in Spain, killing a Saudi pilot
 22 December - 250th Typhoon delivered.
 2012
 21 December - Oman orders 12 Eurofighter Typhoons.
 2013
 4 December - 400th Typhoon delivered.
 2014
 12 December - First full trial installation of Brimstone missile.
 2016
 5 April - Kuwait orders 28 Eurofighter Typhoons.
 13 July - Flights trials of E-Scan radar begin on Eurofighter Typhoon.
 2017
 11 April - 500th Typhoon delivered.

2020s
 2020
 November 2020 - Germany ordered 30 single-seater and 8 twin-seater new Tranche 4 fighters for 5.4 billion euro. The contract for new Tranche 4 versions is to replace Tranche 1 versions currently in service. The latest order from Germany secures production of Eurofighter Typhoon until 2030.

References

Timeline
Eurofighter Typhoon